Denmark competed at the 1998 Winter Paralympics in Nagano, Japan. 3 competitors from Denmark won 2 medals, 1 gold and 1 bronze, and finished joint 16th in the medal table with Australia.

See also 
 Denmark at the Paralympics
 Denmark at the 1998 Winter Olympics

References 

Denmark at the Paralympics
1998 in Danish sport
Nations at the 1998 Winter Paralympics